David Eugene Orleski (born December 26, 1959) is a Canadian former professional ice hockey forward who played 2 games in the National Hockey League for the Montreal Canadiens.

Career statistics

External links

1959 births
Living people
Canadian ice hockey forwards
Ice hockey people from Edmonton
Montreal Canadiens draft picks
Montreal Canadiens players
New Westminster Bruins players
Nova Scotia Oilers players
Nova Scotia Voyageurs players
Salt Lake Golden Eagles (CHL) players
Canadian expatriate ice hockey players in the United States